Ray Stevens (born 23 June 1951) is a former English badminton player and multiple National champion.

Biography
A winner of numerous English national championships and international titles in both singles and doubles, his strengths were his power, tenacity, and concentration.

In 1977 Stevens won a bronze medal in the World Championships in men's doubles. He is also won nine medals in the European Badminton Championships, including two gold medals in men's doubles. He was also twice a runnerup in men's doubles at the prestigious All-England Championships with longtime partner Mike Tredgett.

In 1981 Stevens set a new record by winning his fifth English National Badminton Championships singles title. The record stood until 1993 when his cousin Darren Hall won his sixth of ten titles.

Achievements

World Championships 
Men's doubles

International tournaments 
Men's doubles

References

European results
English statistics
All England champions 1899-2007
Pat Davis: The Encyclopaedia of Badminton. Robert Hale, London, 1987, p. 157, 

1951 births
Living people
English male badminton players
Badminton players at the 1974 British Commonwealth Games
Badminton players at the 1978 Commonwealth Games
Commonwealth Games gold medallists for England
Commonwealth Games silver medallists for England
Commonwealth Games bronze medallists for England
Badminton coaches
Commonwealth Games medallists in badminton
Medallists at the 1974 British Commonwealth Games
Medallists at the 1978 Commonwealth Games